Eccedoxa is a genus of moth in the family Lecithoceridae.

Species
 Eccedoxa lysimopa (Meyrick, 1933)
 Eccedoxa thenara Wu, 2001

References

Natural History Museum Lepidoptera genus database

Torodorinae
Moth genera